Ginoondan is a rural locality in the North Burnett Region, Queensland, Australia. In the  Ginoondan had a population of 16 people.

Geography
The Burnett Highway passes through from south to north-west. After entering from Ban Ban Springs the highway runs north-west before turning south-west towards Gayndah at a crossroads intersection.

History 
Ginoondan Provisional School opened on 26 October 1903. On 1 January 1909 it became Ginoondan State School. It closed in 1949.

In the  Ginoondan had a population of 16 people.

References 

North Burnett Region
Localities in Queensland